Kays or KAYS may refer to:

 KAYS (AM), a radio station
 Waycross-Ware County Airport, by ICAO code
 Kays Catalogues, a former UK mail order catalogue
 Kays Ruiz-Atil, French footballer
 Kays of Scotland, a manufacturer and supplier of curling stones

See also
 Qays, an Arab tribal confederation